Bai Shan (白珊) (born on 4 December 1969), is a Chinese actress. She is currently under contract with Yuzheng Studio. She is especially known for her performances in TV dramas. Born in Chengdu, Sichuan, she graduated from Hunan Art School. Some of her best known roles include Consort Bo in Beauty's Rival in Palace (2010), Lu Mingzhu in Beauty World (2011), and Yuegui in Xiao hongyan (2012).

Biography
She was born on 4 December 1969 in Chengdu, Sichuan, China, into an artistic family. Her mother was a dancer, her father a famous composer. With the influcene of her parents, she embarked on an artistic career early on in her life. As she showed musical talent as a child, her father hoped that she would become a composer. However, she had a passion for acting, and eventually chose to become an actress.

She started her career starring in several films and television works. Her breakthrough came with her portrayal of An Huaying in the 2003 movie Piaoliang de nu linju. She went on to star in more important works, including the 2006 TV series Yōuyōu cùn cǎo xīn (悠悠寸草心), starring as Wu Jinfeng. Her starring roles since then include Consort Bo in the 2010 TV series Beauty's Rival in Palace, Lu Mingzhu in the 2011 TV series Beauty World, and Yuegui in Xiao hongyan (2012). She also starred as Empress Yujiulu in the 2013 television series Legend of Lu Zhen, and as Jin Ruolan in The Legend of Chasing Fish the same year. In 2014 she was Tian Wanniang in Palace 3: The Lost Daughter, in 2015 she starred as Lady Gouyi in Love Yunge from the Desert, and in 2016 as Liang Guiren in Legend of Ban Shu. In 2019 she was Imperial Consort Dowager Yu in Story of Yanxi Palace. Also in 2019, she starred as Li Xuedai in The Legend of Haolan and as  Lady Su in Investiture of the Gods.

Filmography

References

External links 

1969 births
Actors from Chengdu
Living people
21st-century Chinese actresses